Stariyat dub (The Old Tree) is the first release by the Bulgarian punk band Kontrol. It was released in 1988.

In 1989, the first 6 songs were released on BG Rock I. The whole tape later appeared on The Punk Years 1988-1991.

Track list 
 Програма (Programa/Program)
 Обичам те, мила (Obicham te, mila/I Love You, Darling)
 100-150
 Без думи (Bez dumi/Speechless)
 Свобода (Svoboda/Liberty)
 Не умирахме от щастие (Ne umirahme ot shtastie/We Didn't Die of Happiness)
 Има (Ima/There Is)
 Домакиня (Domakinya/Housewife)

1988 albums